Everest '82 is a Canadian drama film miniseries directed by Graeme Campbell and written by Keith Ross Leckie. It aired in the fall of 2008 on CBC television and was produced by Alberta Filmworks.

The series is based on the 1990 book Canadians on Everest: The Courageous Expedition of 1982 by Bruce Patterson of the Times-Colonist newspaper.

Plot
Everest '82  tells the true story of the first Canadians to climb Mount Everest.

The film begins with Laurie Skreslet just having lost his best friend in a climbing accident, that happened near Banff. He believes the accident was his fault. The movie then switches to an Everest expedition making its way through the dramatic Nepalese countryside approaching the mountain.  The expedition leaders are already fighting, which does little to reassure the conflicted doubts Laurie has about climbing and the guilt he feels over his friend's death.

Once they are on the mountain a huge avalanche kills three of them. Two days later, a collapse of ice crushes another. Everything goes wrong, the media turns against them, the sponsors cut off supplies and tell them to come home, the mountain is too unstable. Because of this half of the climbers leave. As the rest of the climbers are about to go, Laurie reflects on the situation, digging deep within himself to find inspiration and becomes convinced he must go on. He talks a couple of them into continuing up the mountain, inspired by the ghosts of past climbers, their deaths and triumphs.

Cast

References

External links
 Official Everest '82 website
 
 CBC's Everest dramatic, but it shortchanged climbers, Bruce Patterson, Times-Colonist, 14 September 2008. Retrieved 2009-9-8.

2007 television films
2007 films
CBC Television original films
English-language Canadian films
Canadian drama television films
Canadian films based on actual events
Films set in 1982
Canadian independent films
2000s Canadian television miniseries
Films about Mount Everest
Films directed by Graeme Campbell (director)
2000s Canadian films